This is an inclusive list of science fiction television programs whose names begin with the letter Y.

Y
Animated
Yin Yang Yo! (2006–2009, US/Canada, animated)
Yogi Bear (franchise) (elements of science fiction):
Yogi's Space Race (1978, animated)
Galaxy Goof-Ups (1978–1979, animated)

References

Television programs, Y